AdventureQuest Worlds (often shortened to AQ Worlds or simply AQW) is a browser-based massively multiplayer online role-playing game (MMORPG) released by Artix Entertainment in 2008.

Gameplay
Players are asked to choose from one of four "starting classes" (warrior, rogue, mage, or healer), each with different strengths and weaknesses. Leveling up lets characters learn new abilities and increase their attack power. Players have five different skills. Depending on their character's class; the ability that is common to all classes is the "auto-attack" ability. Individual abilities, deemed "passive" abilities, may be unlocked after the character reaches a certain Rank. Players. begin at Rank 1 and progress as they receive class points from defeating enemies; this may depend on the enemy's level and difficulty stars (1-5). Players gain experience and gold when enemies have been defeated. Players can also acquire other classes by gaining Reputation by completing quests in a certain location.

AdventureQuest Worlds has events on special occasions. A new event is added to the game every other Friday. Some events are one time only while others are seasonal events that appear once every year. Often, participants in these events can procure event-specific items not available at any other time in the game. There is an anniversary on October 10 which enables the players to partake in the birthday-themed events and have access to the Underground Lab. Some events feature live events with guest stars like Korn, Voltaire, One-Eyed Doll, George Lowe, Paul and Storm, Jonathan Coulton, the cast of Ctrl+Alt+Del, Ayi Jihu, ArcAttack, They Might Be Giants, Andrew Huang, Mia J. Park, The Crüxshadows, Dreamers. Cassandra Peterson as Elvira, and Michael Sinterniklaas as the voice of Deady.

The game is set in a universe similar to those in AdventureQuest, DragonFable, and MechQuest. It was established that the Eternal Dragon of Time allowed the dragonslayer Galanoth to slay him which resulted in the hourglasses within the Dragon of Time's heart to shatter and the sands that represented the three worlds within each hourglass to merge resulting in the AdventureQuest Worlds universe being created. The goal of the game is to adventure through Lore, move on to higher levels, face the 13 Lords of Chaos, and fight Drakath: Champion of Chaos. As the story progresses, the player meets the Queen of Monsters who chose Drakath to be her Champion, and Malgor, a fully-evolved Mumblerand the Queen's rival that wishes to end the constant cycle of war and conflict on Lore.

Plot

Prologue
The player character, known simply as 'Hero' arrives in the midst of a war between two factions, the Evil and the Good. In the town of Oaklore, undead forces have begun plaguing its residents. Among other soldiers, the hero faces off against the undead attacking Oaklore and makes their way to an elite Evil soldier known as the Dread Dragon deeper in battle.

Having defeated the Dread Dragon, the hero continues their journey to Swordhaven, capital of Lore where King Alteon, leader of the Good army and his remaining forces fend against another invasion by the undead. Relentless assaults by the undead allows Sepulchure and his elite group of undead to enter the castle and battle the king, Alteon. Drakath, later introduced as the Champion of Chaos, interrupts the personal combat and strikes the two away from each other infecting them with a sickness known as Chaorruption. Agitated by the sudden interruption, Sepulchure decides to attack Drakath in spite of his weakened state and fails as Drakath counters and eventually kills him. The hero and corrupted Alteon watching the scene unfold are spared by Drakath.

Sepulchure's death alerts his daughter Gravelyn. Now the new ruler of the Evil forces, the grieving empress swears to avenge her father's death by defeating Drakath. With a common enemy, this led to the truce between the Good and Evil empires.

13 Lords of Chaos Saga
There are already signs of corruption in the nearby forest and marsh causing the player to capture the Chaorrupted Wolves, Chaorrupted Bear, and Chaos Spiders alongside some antidote-based plants to be studied. Drakath forms the 13 Lords of Chaos by recruiting the mage Escherion, the Drow Dragonlord Vath, the Yōkai Shogun Kitsune, the Werepyre Wolfwing, and singer Kimberly Freeman. They are instructed to unleash their Chaos Beasts upon Lore, which the player has to defeat one by one.

The 7th Lords of Chaos Ledgermayne later rebels against Drakath and instead moves towards causing Lore's destruction. When the hero fights him, Drakath suddenly deals the finishing blow and reveals that he will be saving Alteon and the hero for last, before fleeing. Then the players take on the Chaos Djinn Tibicenas in the Sandsea.

In Bloodtusk Ravine, mass confusion and hysteria (partly due to the Chaos Lords Xing and Xang interfering) arises between the Horcs and the Trolls as it is revealed that one of the Lords of Chaos is among them and is sending Chaorrupted monsters to them. It is soon revealed that the Troll Krellenos is the Lord of Chaos in question, but he is quickly killed by Khasaanda who absorbs his Chaorruption and becomes the new Chaos Lord. Khasaanda, seeking vengeance, begins to hunt down Drakath. Drakath quickly shows up, and offers the hero the choice of either sparing Khasaanda to continue her goal to kill Drakath, or to defeat her due to being a Chaos Lord that could potentially disrupt Lore. Khasaanda then goes off to find Drakath herself, regardless of the choice made.

The hero then ventures into the Span, where they meet the chronomancer Iadoa. Iadoa has recently been made the a new Lord of Chaos, but he is trying to use his time to mentor the hero before he succumbs to the Chaorruption. Iadoa tells the story of Galanoth slaying the Eternal Dragon of Time to the hero, while motivating them to finally defeat Drakath. Iadoa ultimately fails to resist the Chaorruption and is soon forced to be defeated by the hero.

After a period of time, Maximillian Lionfang kidnaps the hero's allies, viewing them to be against the forces of Good. Gravelyn and the hero then intervene and rescue them via leading an attack on his tower. Lionfang is ultimately defeated, but not before he is made into the eleventh Chaos Lord by Drakath. Lionfang then attacks Falguard, seeking the Tears of the Mother to end Chaos. While he is briefly tricked into retrieving a fake replica, he soon retrieves the real vial of the Tears and throws it at Drakath. As the Champion of Chaos and not a mere Chaos Lord, Drakath shrugs it off. Lionfang, in a fit of fury, accuses the hero of lying and fights them. After the conflict, the hero soon discovers that Drakath plans to activate runes on the Chaos Portal upon the defeat of each Chaos Lord in order to free his master, the Queen of Monsters. Lionfang is then sent falling, but his body is nowhere to be found.

The hero then ventures into the Mirror World, where they learn that the Xang in Lore is, in fact, the Xang from the Mirror Realm, rendering both Xing and Xang evil and causing an imbalance. Right as Xing and Xang are about to merge into Xiang, the hero manages to send Lore's Xang through the portal, causing balance to return with the help of Mirror Drakath. The fusion is still successful, but during the final fight with Xiang, Xang takes over and attempts to help the hero, before Xing regains control. This ultimately ends with Xiang's defeat. 

Meanwhile in Swordhaven, Alteon begins to succumb to his own Chaorruption from the clash in the intro, and soon becomes the 12th Lord of Chaos. Alteon then lays waste to Swordhaven, before he begs the hero to kill him to put an end to his destruction.

The hero then ventures up to Mount Doomskull to confront Drakath once and for all, fighting off hordes of Chaorrupted monsters in the process while noting that the 13th Lord of Chaos hasn't shown up yet. The seemingly final confrontation ends with Drakath being the victor, and he Chaorrupts the hero as the 13th Lord of Chaos. The hero, driven mad by the Chaorruption, attacks various locations in Lore. They soon manage to awaken their Chaos Beast, the Eternal Dragon of Time.

Using some of its abilities, they summon all of the previous Chaos Beasts to lead Lore to its destruction. However, the hero becomes so mad with power that they ultimately decide to vanquish the Chaos Beasts they summoned and usurp Drakath. Drakath then reveals that the hero and the Eternal Dragon of Time are one and the same, before killing the hero. The hero, now trapped within Death's realm, makes a deal with Nulgath to defeat Death himself and thus become the new Death. Meanwhile, Gravelyn and the rest of the alliance lead an attack on Drakath's forces. With the deal's conditions fulfilled, the hero escapes and confronts Drakath for the final battle. During the final conflict, Drakath manages to kill the first Chaos Lord Escherion (who was turned into a frog) and Khasaanda, the last Chaos Lords that needed to be defeated in order to complete the ritual to summon the Queen of Monsters.

When in the Chaos Realm, the hero fights the revived Chaos versions of the 13 Lords of Chaos including their clone as the 13th Lord of Chaos. Drakath is ultimately defeated, but is left alive by the hero within the Chaos Realm (and is later revealed to have escaped to fight the Queen's forces). The hero then ventures out of the portal, entering a world terrorized by the Queen.

Queen of Monsters: Ancient Evils saga
Now that the Queen of Monsters has been freed, she plans to raise each of the eight Elemental Titans that are scattered across the shattered continent of Drakonus. The Elemental Titans were created by the Elemental Avatars to represent them. As not all of the Elemental Titans were consent with their roles where they stepped on lesser creatures and fought dragons, the Elemental Avatars put the Elemental Titans to sleep in the different parts of Drakonus. The Queen of Monsters plans to use her minions to awaken all eight of the Elemental Titans so that a new era can begin. During the struggle with one of her generals named Tyndarius, Sepulchure's spirit regenerates and possesses the fire dragon Akriloth's body. After this fusion is defeated, his spirit leaves with another fragment awakening within Gravelyn's Doomblade. After Phedra: Elemental Titan of Fire and Gaiazor: Elemental Titan of Earth are awakened, a minion of the Queen of Monsters asks if they would awaken the Elemental Titan of Darkness. The Queen of Monsters dismisses that idea and states that they will take "another path,” which is later revealed to be the Queen’s army of Infernals from the Infernal Realm stealing Celestial weaponry in order to make themselves more powerful. The Infernal army then invades Lore, ultimately forcing Gravelyn, the hero, and their allies to escape as both Shadowfall and Swordhaven are invaded at the cost of Princess Tara.

Throne of Darkness saga
The Mysterious Figure gathers Vaden the Death Knight, Vath's daughter Xeight, Ziri the Sneevil Daemon, Drakel Warlord Pax, Pharaoh of the Black Hole Sun Sekt, and Queen Scarletta Tyrall at their castle lair to learn about their encounters with the players. Following the story of the sentient table Plank who mentioned how he, Dr. Dryden Darkwood, and their Trolluk servant Skudly had captured the players, the Mysterious Figure is seemingly revealed to be Dr. Dryden Darkwood as they tell the assembled villains that they have the hero in their dungeon. When the players defeat Dr. Darkwood and Skudly, they borrow Dr. Darkwood's hooded robe and pose as him in order to listen to the villains' story. Upon unmasking themselves, the players defeat the vengeful villains and return their cursed items to them in exchange that they listen to his proposition to help them against a greater darkness. The villains agree to the terms while Plank has an idea on who the threat is. The final image shows Sepulchure's helm.

Book of Monsters saga
At the time when the players are fighting the Queen of Monsters' forces, a rift opens in the Neverglades as the Elder Monster called Extriki the Destroyer emerges and renders the surrounding areas toxic. When the players defeat, capture, and interrogate the toxic monster Zognax, it tells the players that Extriki and the monsters that came from the Rift thrive on toxic and can't survive in non-toxic location. In addition, Zognax states that Extriki is one of the Queen of Monsters' earlier children. With help from the Heart of the Grove from Brightoak, the players are able to weaken Extriki and slay it. Then the players deal with Kolyaban the Reshaper who is the Queen of Monsters' oldest daughter and the first Darkblood as she reshapes some creatures and the pet vendor Aria. Her appearance causes a Darkblood civil war where the players free Aria from Kolyaban's control and defeat Kolyaban who escapes. Meanwhile, Aria meets with the Avatar of Nature, who eventually grants her the ability to reshape herself as the Champion of Nature.

Shadows of War saga
After a period of months, another rift suddenly opens with the hero being sent to investigate while storming the Queen of Monsters' lair. They immediately stumble upon the shadow lord Malgor and his Shadowflame army, the former of which reveals that the hero killed the Queen of Monsters as Malgor holds her head, but the hero is unable to recall these events. Malgor then offers the hero to join him in his goal to unify everyone into his forces and put an end to the cycle of war in Lore. Varga: Goddess of War intervenes and rescues the hero before mentoring them on having them remember some of their abilities as the Eternal Dragon of Time they forgot. After besting Malgor's minion Shadowknight Gar, the hero then begins to gather allies that were previously working for Malgor’s army while fighting off hordes of his forces throughout Lore. They gain allies like the Pirate Queen Teja, the Kittarian cat burglar Jinx, and the Spirit Mage Mahou. Malgor even tried to get Dage the Evil, Nulgath, and Drakath on his side to no avail. Malgor then enlists Tyndraius in a plot to invade the Plane of Fire and steal the powers of Lady Fiamme: Avatar of Fire which turns Tyndarius into a giant lava monster. Fiamme uses what's left of her powers to awaken Galanoth as the Champion of Fire. The other Elemental Avatars find out what Malgor and Tyndarius did and dispatch their Elementals to help fight the Shadowfire army and a Shadowflame-corrupted version of Tyndarius' old centaur enemy Kyron. The players find that Malgor is keeping Tyndarius from dying from the side-effects of stealing Lady Fiamme's powers and that Malgor takes advantage of anyone's anguish and personal trauma. Varga helps to train Galanoth and the other Elemental Champions. After the players and Galanoth spar with Varga, the players fight through Tyndarius' forces and persuade his envoy Elius to help them. When Galanoth uses his Champion of Fire abilities to turn into a dragon and send a fireball towards Malgor, it enables Lady Fiamme to reclaim her powers where she spares Tyndarius' life as he makes Elius the new leader of their people. Unfortunately, Malgor has taken control of the Mana Core. This action affects all the mana on Lore and even causes Shadow Knight Gar to melt into a draconic form which unknowingly helps Drakath drag Malgor into the timestream after Malgor stole the Queen of Monsters' heart. The players, Gravelyn, and Drakath learn that Malgor was an evolved Mumbler that spawned from the players' doubts due to a reality where the players' allies saw them as the Eternal Dragon of Time bite off the Queen of Monsters' head. As a Mumbler, Malgor went through his False Wyvern and Twisted Wyvern forms trying to avert this. While restrained by Malgor, the players hear a voice coming from the Mana Core. When in the Mana Core which is also called the Plane of Mana, the players, Gravelyn, and Drakath find a restored Princess Tara who was the supposed Champion of Mana as they contend with the Old World Order members Mask of Infamy, Mask of Law, and Mask of Tranquility. After some challenges where Gravelyn takes on Mask of Infamy, Drakath takes on Mask of Law, and the players defeat Mask of Tranquility, they find that Malgor is going deeper into the Plane of Mana where the dormant Mana Avatar Einsof resides. By the time the players and Princess Tara catch up to Malgor at Einsof's "cradle", they find that he has swallowed the Queen of Monsters' heart. When the players defeat him, Einsof wakes up and grants Malgor's wish where he is transformed into a dragon-like demigod form called Mainyu. Upon his defeat, the players assume their Dragon of Time form and send Malgor back to when he was formed trapping him in a timeloop which is what he wanted. When Einsof is put back into their sleep to prevent too much mana from being let loose onto Lore, the Old World Order warns the players and Princess Tara that there will be upcoming threats in the form of the Voice Deep in the Sea, the Rumbling of Cold Thunder, and the Flame of the Beyond. Then they return everyone to the surface of Lore. As Princess Tara reunites with Princess Victoria, Brentan joins Tara in renouncing their royal title as Tara will become the players' companion and Brentan will understand the subjects better. Gravelyn will lay low for awhile until the Shadowscythe recovers as she plans to advise Dage the Evil to do the same thing. Drakath made it back to Crownsreach to recover where he lost his wings fighting Mask of Law.

Reception
Kotaku's Mike Fahey praised the idea of using advertisements when the player died. Pete Davison, from GamePro, also noted the advertisements at Death, calling it an "interesting" idea.

References

External links
 

2008 video games
Artix Entertainment
Browser games
Browser-based multiplayer online games
Flash games
Fantasy massively multiplayer online role-playing games
Active massively multiplayer online games
Massively multiplayer online role-playing games
Persistent worlds
Video games developed in the United States
Video games about genies